The Broken Horseshoe is a 1953 British crime film directed by Martyn C. Webster and starring Robert Beatty, Elizabeth Sellars, Peter Coke, and Hugh Kelly. A surgeon is drawn into a murder case when he offers shelter to a woman who has witnessed a killing linked to a horse-doping syndicate. It was based on a six-part television series The Broken Horseshoe, which had aired the previous year.

Plot
A hit-and-run victim is operated on by Dr. Fenton (Beatty), but the patient is later murdered, and the doctor finds himself the prime suspect. The mysterious Della (Elizabeth Sellars), connected to a horse-doping ring, falls for the doctor and helps him clear his name and expose the villains.

Cast
 Robert Beatty as Dr. Mark Fenton 
 Elizabeth Sellars as Della Freeman 
 Peter Coke as Detective Inspector George Bellamy 
 Hugh Kelly as Dr. Craig 
 Janet Butler as Sister Rogers 
 Vida Hope as Jackie Leroy 
 Ferdy Mayne as Charles Constance 
 James Raglan as Superintendent Grayson 
 George Benson as Prescott 
 Roger Delgado as Felix Gallegos  
 Ronald Leigh-Hunt as Sergeant Lewis 
 Hugh Pryse as Mr. Rattray 
 Toke Townley as Fred Barker

References

1953 films
British crime drama films
1953 crime drama films
1950s English-language films
Films based on television series
British black-and-white films
1950s British films